E. M. Antoniadi (1810–1944) was a Greek-French astronomer.

Antoniadi may also refer to:

Antoniadi (lunar crater)
Antoniadi (Martian crater)
Antoniadi scale, a weather condition system
Antoniadi Dorsum, a wrinkle ridge on Mercury

See also 
Antoniadis
Antoniani